Kondō, Kondo or Kondou (近藤 "near wisteria") is a surname prominent in Japanese culture, although it also occurs in other countries. Notable people with the surname include:

, Japanese ballet dancer
 Dorinne K. Kondo, anthropologist
, chief of the Shinsengumi
, physicist, researcher of the Kondo effect
, manga artist, character designer, animator and animation director
, Japanese composer and musician
, Japanese ice hockey player
 Mamadou Kondo, Malian footballer
 Marie Kondo (born 1984), organizing consultant and author
, Japanese bureaucrat
, or Matchy, Japanese singer, lyricist and actor
, professional shogi player
, Japan Maritime Self-Defense Force admiral
, Imperial Japanese Navy admiral
, professional shogi player
, professional wrestler
, professional wrestler and shoot boxer
, Japanese pole vaulter
, photographer of Sado island
, a member of the 1980s J-Pop duo BaBe
, Japanese trumpet player
, Japanese politician
, animator and film director
, mixed martial arts fighter
Yoshio Kondo (1910–1990), biologist and malacologist
, Japanese curler

Japanese-language surnames